Sal Glacier is a glacier,  long, flowing north between Salen Mountain and Mount Bergersen in the Sor Rondane Mountains. Mapped by Norwegian cartographers in 1957 from air photos taken by U.S. Navy Operation Highjump, 1946–47, and named Salbreen (the saddle glacier), probably for its association with Salen Mountain.

See also
 List of glaciers in the Antarctic
 Glaciology

References
 

Glaciers of Queen Maud Land
Princess Ragnhild Coast